Admiral Holloway may refer to:

Daniel Holloway (admiral) (born 1956), U.S. Navy vice admiral
James L. Holloway Jr. (1898–1984), U.S. Navy admiral
James L. Holloway III (1922–2019), U.S. Navy admiral
John Holloway (Royal Navy officer) (1744–1826), British Royal Navy admiral